Bruce George Ronald Murray, 12th Duke of Atholl OStJ (born 5/6 April 1960), is a South African-born hereditary peer in the Peerage of Scotland and Chief of Clan Murray. As Duke of Atholl, he has the right to raise Europe's only legal private army, the Atholl Highlanders, a unique privilege granted to his family by Queen Victoria after visiting Blair Atholl in 1844.

Early life and career
The elder son of John Murray, 11th Duke of Atholl, and Margaret Yvonne  Leach, now styled the Dowager Duchess of Atholl, graduated from Jeppe High School for Boys Johannesburg in 1979. He was educated at Saasveld Forestry College before serving his two years' National Service with the South African Infantry Corps. He is currently a volunteer member of the Transvaal Scottish Regiment, holding the rank of lieutenant. Previously he managed a tea plantation, but then ran a signage business producing signs for commercial buildings. He was commissioned into the Atholl Highlanders in 2000, being appointed as lieutenant colonel. Upon the death of his father on 15 May 2012, he succeeded to all his father's titles, becoming the 12th Duke of Atholl.

Marriages and children
The Duke first married on 4 February 1984, in Johannesburg, to Lynne Elizabeth Andrew (born Johannesburg, 7 June 1963), daughter of Nicholas George Andrew of Bedfordview, South Africa (born Brighton, East Sussex, June 1939) and wife Evelyn Donne de Villiers, and they divorced in 2003. Together they had three children, two sons and one daughter: 
 Michael Bruce John Murray, Marquess of Tullibardine (born in Louis Trichardt, 5 March 1985)
 Lord David Nicholas George Murray (born in Louis Trichardt, 31 January 1986)
 Lady Nicole Murray (born in Duiwelskloof, 11 July 1987); married to Peter Piek

He married secondly Charmaine Myrna du Toit in 2009, without issue.

References

 "Burke's Peerage and Baronetage"
 http://www.van-gool.info/Leach.htm
 http://familytreemaker.genealogy.com/users/d/u/p/Amanda-M-Du-plessis/WEBSITE-0001/UHP-0011.html
 http://www.southafricansettlers.com/

External links
 Profile, clanmurray.org
 Profile, burkespeerage.com
 Bruce Murray, 12th Duke of Atholl

1960 births
Bruce
112
Dukes of Rannoch
Living people
Officers of the Order of St John
South African people of Afrikaner descent
South African people of Scottish descent